A bier is a flat frame used to carry a corpse to burial. 

Bier or Biers may also refer to:


People
Bier (surname)

Fictional characters and places
 D'Anna Biers or Number Three (Battlestar Galactica), a Cylon in the re-imagined Battlestar Galactica television series
 Riley Biers, a vampire in the Twilight novel series
 Biers, a pub in Ankh-Morpork in Terry Pratchett's Discworld novels

Places
 Bier, Maryland, an unincorporated community
 Bier Point, Antarctica

Other uses
 Biological indicator evaluation resistometer
 Bier is a German word for beer

See also
 Bier block, a technique for intravenous regional anesthesia named after August Bier
 Bier spots, small, light macules occurring in cases of Marshall–White syndrome
 Biar (disambiguation)
 Bere (disambiguation)
 Beer (disambiguation)